Salehabad District is a district (bakhsh) in Mehran County, Ilam Province, Iran. At the 2006 census, its population was 3,859, in 795 families.  The District has one city: Salehabad. The District has one rural district (dehestan): Hejdandasht Rural District.

References 

Districts of Ilam Province
Mehran County